Wilson Godfrey Harvey (September 8, 1866October 7, 1932) was the 94th Governor of South Carolina from May 20, 1922, to January 16, 1923.

Biography
Born in Charleston, Harvey attended Charleston High School before dropping out at the age of 16 to work as a clerk in the office of The News and Courier. Five years later he became the manager of another Charleston newspaper, the World and Budget. Showing a penchant for business, Harvey was also involved with the management of Bradstreet Company and the organization of the Enterprise Bank of Charleston. From 1903 to 1911, Harvey served on the Charleston Board of Aldermen and became the Mayor Pro Tempore of Charleston in 1910.

Harvey was elected in 1920 to be the 70th Lieutenant Governor of South Carolina and was elevated to the governorship in 1922 upon the resignation of Governor Robert Archer Cooper. He continued the progressive reforms initiated by former governors Cooper and Richard Irvine Manning III by instigating higher standards in education and by favoring the use of concrete for road construction.

After finishing the term as governor in 1923, Harvey returned to the private sector where he managed a number of insurance companies. In 1923 he declared bankruptcy after the Enterprise Bank failed; he was tried in 1924 and acquitted on charges of fraud for continuing to accept deposits after he knew of the bank's failure.

He died in Tampa, Florida, on October 7, 1932. He was interred in Magnolia Cemetery in Charleston.

External links 
 SCIway Biography of Wilson Godfrey Harvey
 NGA Biography of Wilson Godfrey Harvey

1866 births
1932 deaths
Democratic Party governors of South Carolina
University of South Carolina trustees
Burials at Magnolia Cemetery (Charleston, South Carolina)